Coenonia is a genus of bacteria. Up to now there is only one species of this genus known: Coenonia anatina.

References

Flavobacteria
Monotypic bacteria genera
Bacteria genera